Cysoing is a commune in the Nord department in northern France,  southeast of Lille. It is twinned with the English town of Much Wenlock.  An obsolete spelling is Cisoin.

Heraldry

Population

Bordering municipalities 
Cysoing is bordered by Bouvines, Sainghin-en-Mélantois, Gruson, Camphin-en-Pévèle, Bourghelles, Cobrieux, Genech, Louvil, Templeuve-en-Pévèle, and Péronne-en-Mélantois.

See also
Communes of the Nord department
 Souvenir Henri Desgrange

References

Communes of Nord (French department)
French Flanders